Mercury Corporation was originally an aircraft manufacturer established in Hammondsport, New York in 1920. It built aircraft using the name Mercury Aircraft.

Mercury started as an aircraft supply house selling surplus parts for Curtiss JN-4 aircraft flown after World War I. Once the supply of parts ran out, the company manufactured various aircraft components including radios and dirigible gondolas.

In 1927, The company renamed itself Mercury Aircraft. It was led by Joseph F. Meade, Sr. and Harvey Mummert. In 1928, Mercury came out with the two place all-metal aircraft, the T-2 Mercury Chic for $3500.

With a close relationship to Curtiss aircraft's home. Mercury built a replica of the 1908 AEA June Bug in 1976, flying it in airshows across the country.

Mercury Corporation now operates in multiple locations around the world manufacturing custom and mass-production components

Aircraft

References

Defunct aircraft manufacturers of the United States
Companies based in New York (state)
Vehicle manufacturing companies established in 1920
1920 establishments in New York (state)
Buildings and structures in Steuben County, New York
Hammondsport, New York